Jaime Bravo (September 8, 1932 – February 2, 1970) was a Mexican matador during the 1950s and 1960s. Bravo was known for his death-defying style and numerous relationships with various women and Hollywood starlets.

Early life
Bravo was born in the infamous Tepito District of México City, to Spanish parents. In his early twenties he stowed away on a ship to Cuba, and then on another to Spain, where he learned his art. Bravo took his  in Valencia, and was later confirmed in Madrid.

Career

Hollywood films
During the 1950s and 1960s, Mexico was full of crossover movie stars including Antonio Aguilar, making western films and usually singing in them like a Latin version of Elvis, the scripts groomed to fit his more high-profile career. Gaston Santos, the rejoneador, was also making movies. Wrestlers like Blue Demon, El Santo, Chanoc, Mil Mascaras and Nathaniel Leon had roles in horror films, while bullfighters like Carlos Arruza, Luis Procuna, Manuel Capetillo, and David Liceaga also entered the field. As a bullfighter for many years, Bravo was especially popular with the ladies and border town crowds. In the eyes of some producers, he had the looks and the charm, if not the talent, to achieve screen stardom.

Bravo played a small part in a movie called Call of a Bull, which was available through a California distributor some years ago in both English and Spanish. The film starred Emilio Fernández and a cast of Americans, with the main theme being about a woman wanting to be a bullfighter. Bravo took the role more to see how he looked on the screen.

Another film, which was scandalous for the time, Love Has Many Faces (1965) featured Bravo as a matador. Starring Lana Turner, Cliff Robertson, Hugh O'Brian, Ruth Roman, and Stefanie Powers. Although Bravo spoke English very well, the film's producers used another actor's voice to dub over Bravo's thick accent.

He was also the topic of a documentary directed by Art Swerdloff. This film, titled The Story of a Matador (1962), was a David Wolper production, with Bravo demonstrating what a bullfighter went through as he rose to stardom in the rings. "It is one of my favourite half hour films", Swerdloff commented recently when asked about it; "One of the best I've done."

Away from the bullrings, Bravo already had the reputation of a big screen movie idol, if only because of his often scandalous behaviour. Numerous affairs with Hollywood's biggest and most beautiful names lead to an infamous reputation then and now. He is still remembered for frequently having a number of his girlfriends seated throughout the crowd at some of his bullfights, unbeknownst to one another.

Quite the character, Bravo was a true showman. Although a top matador, Bravo's fame was driven more by his persona and his unrelenting bravery. Always pushing the envelope of drama and danger just a bit further than his contemporaries, Bravo drew tremendous crowds who were mesmerized by his repeated flirtations with danger and death. As one journalist put it, "The bull was probably scared of Jaime." "Jaime was gored more than 50 times in his career." Larry Jones, an official of a Tijuana ring, said when informed of the bullfighter's death, "He was very daring and thought he had to get injured to please the fans. Bravo delighted in challenging the bull to the fullest extent. He was popular in Tijuana because he was flashy and colorful. Few bullfighters took more chances than Jaime." Fans thought that his early training as a trapezista saved his life in the bull ring many times. A native of Mexico City, Jaime seldom fought there because he was so popular in border towns like Tijuana.

Personal life

Utilizing scandal
Bravo also had the uncanny knack of utilizing scandal to garner headlines. During an August 1968 corrida, playing to the tourist crowds of Tijuana, Bravo "requested the animal be spared. This, in turn, was denied, and the torero [Bravo] who refused to kill the bull was escorted to the local jail and fined". Bravo received headlines for his defiance. Only one month earlier, at a July 1968 corrida, Bravo had used a similar press-grabbing tactic, when he was not performing his best, and another matador's superior performance was poised to gain the next day's headlines. Before that corrida ended, Bravo cursed at the bullring judge, just enough to infuriate the judge so that Bravo was immediately arrested and jailed. Cameras captured countless photos of Bravo being cuffed, escorted from the bullring, and locked in a jail cell. The next day, the newspapers' headlines boldly declared that Jaime Bravo had been jailed. Much further down the page, and in much smaller type, only a few sentences detailed the other matador's brilliant performance.

Never a dull moment for the crowds, gossip around Bravo was further promulgated by such actions as his behavior during a 1957 Tijuana bullfight, during which he tossed flowers to Ava Gardner from the ring. She was at the corrida with actor Gilbert Roland.

One of the biggest scandals concerning Bravo's misadventures was related to Arabella Arbenz, daughter of Guatemala's former leftwing president Jacobo Arbenz. A fashion model and actress, Arbenz carried on a relationship with Bravo. She shot herself on October 5, 1965, after being spurned by Bravo after a bad bullfight.

Marriages
Bravo was married three times. He first married actress Francesca De Scaffa in 1957. The marriage was a fiasco and was eventually annulled the same year by the appropriate magistrate, as a favor to Bravo's friend Pablo Picasso, who gave the signed annulment to Bravo as a belated wedding gift.

In 1957, Bravo married the actress Ann Robinson, by whom he had his first two sons, Jaime and Estefan. In 1967, two years after appearing in a 1965 Las Vegas promotional bullfight, he married a Las Vegas showgirl named Monica Lind (from Les Folies Bergère), by whom he had his third and final son, named Aleco Jaime Bravo.

Final years and death
By the late 1960s, Bravo was a renowned bullfighter, known still for his charisma and good looks. He began looking to the film world for a career that might suit him once he retired from the bulls. There were a variety of production companies keen to give him a chance in film. His profile remained such that he could still draw crowds from within the Mexican interior and the US, especially with a large following in border towns such as Tijuana, Nogales, Ciudad Juárez and Matamoros, and states such as California, Arizona, and Texas.

On February 2, 1970, Bravo and his driver were killed in a car accident near Zacatecas, Mexico. Eloy Cavazos, a fellow matador, who was one of Jaime's protégés, was also in the car, but survived. Cavazos continued on to have a very long career as one of Mexico's, and the world's, top matadors.

Sources
 Matador Jaime Bravo
 Pulp Movies
 
 "Toros" Magazines
 Programs - International Bullfight
 "Matadors of Mexico" (1961), Ann D. Miller
 Various newspapers from the 1960s

References

External links
 Official site
 "Glory vs. Death: At the Corrida in Tijuana" - ESPN, May 25, 2006

Mexican bullfighters
Mexican male film actors
Mexican people of Spanish descent
Male actors from Mexico City
Sportspeople from Mexico City
Road incident deaths in Mexico
1932 births
1970 deaths
20th-century Mexican male actors
Mexican expatriates in the United States